'Bryn' is a surname of Welsh origin, meaning 'Hill'.

Notable people with the surname include:

 Alexia Bryn (1889–1983), Norwegian pair skater 
 Alfred Jørgen Bryn (1862–1937), Norwegian patent engineer
 Halfdan Bryn (1864–1933), Norwegian physical anthropologist
 Olaf Bryn (1872–1948), Norwegian politician
 Thomas Bryn (1782–1827), Norwegian jurist, magistrate and civil servant
 Yngvar Bryn (1881–1947), Norwegian track and field athlete and pair skater

See also
 Bryn (given name)
 Brynn (disambiguation)
 Bryne (disambiguation)

References